The 1911 Colorado Silver and Gold football team was an American football team that represented the University of Colorado as a member of the Rocky Mountain Conference (RMC) during the 1911 college football season. In its 11th year under head coach Fred Folsom, the team compiled a 6–0 record (5–0 against RMC opponents), won the conference championship, and outscored opponents by a total of 88 to 5.

Colorado sustained a 21-game win streak that began on November 26, 1908, and ended on October 12, 1912. It remains the longest such streak in program history.

Schedule

References

Colorado
Colorado Buffaloes football seasons
College football undefeated seasons
Rocky Mountain Athletic Conference football champion seasons
Colorado Silver and Gold football